Alexander Sands (born 1870; date of death unknown) was a footballer who played for Port Vale in September 1893.

Career
Sands joined Football League Second Division club Port Vale from Dunoon in August 1893. He scored on his debut at the Athletic Ground in a 4–2 win over Ardwick on 2 September. However, he failed to turn up for the next match and was released before the month was out.

Career statistics
Source:

References

1870 births
Year of death missing
People from Dunoon
Sportspeople from Argyll and Bute
Scottish footballers
Association football wingers
Port Vale F.C. players
English Football League players